The 1987 Trans America Athletic Conference men's basketball tournament (now known as the ASUN men's basketball tournament) was held March 7–9 at Barton Coliseum in Little Rock, Arkansas.

Georgia Southern defeated conference newcomer  in the championship game, 49–46, to win their second TAAC/Atlantic Sun men's basketball tournament. The Eagles, therefore, received an automatic bid to the 1987 NCAA tournament.

Texas–San Antonio joined the TAAC for the 1986–87 season, bringing the total conference membership to 10. However, only the top eight teams were invited to participate in the 1987 conference tournament.

Bracket

References

ASUN men's basketball tournament
Tournament
TAAC men's basketball tournament
TAAC men's basketball tournament